Soraima Martha (born 10 January 1967) is a sprinter who represented the Netherlands Antilles. She competed in the women's 200 metres at the 1984 Summer Olympics.

References

External links
 

1967 births
Living people
Athletes (track and field) at the 1984 Summer Olympics
Dutch Antillean female sprinters
Olympic athletes of the Netherlands Antilles
World Athletics Championships athletes for the Netherlands Antilles
People from Willemstad
Olympic female sprinters